Yale Repertory Theatre at Yale University in New Haven, Connecticut was founded by Robert Brustein, dean of Yale School of Drama, in 1966, with the goal of facilitating a meaningful collaboration between theatre professionals and talented students. In the process it has become one of the first distinguished regional theatres. Located at the edge of Yale's main downtown campus, it occupies the former Calvary Baptist Church.

History
As head of Yale Repertory Theatre ("the Rep") from 1966 to 1979, Robert Brustein brought professional actors to Yale each year to form a repertory company and nurtured notable new authors including Christopher Durang.  Some successful works were transferred to commercial theaters. Michael Feingold was the first literary manager.

The dean of Yale School of Drama is the artistic director of the Yale Repertory Theatre, with Lloyd Richards (who most notably nurtured the career of August Wilson) serving in this capacity 1979–1991, Stan Wojewodski, Jr., 1991–2002, and James Bundy since 2002. Benjamin Mordecai served as managing director from 1982 to 1993. Victoria Nolan was managing director from 1993 to 2020.  Her successor was Florie Seery.

Of the more than 90 world premieres the Rep has produced, four have won Pulitzer Prizes; ten productions have received Tony Awards after being transferred to Broadway, and Yale Repertory Theatre was given a Drama Desk Special Award in 1988 and the Tony Award for Outstanding Regional Theatre in 1991.

In 2002, Yale School of Drama and Yale Repertory Theatre received the Governor's Arts Award from Governor John G. Rowland for artistic achievement and contribution to the arts in the state of Connecticut.

Calvary Baptist Church Building
Calvary Baptist Church was erected in 1846 in the Gothic revival architectural style on a plot of land that was the original home of Richard Platt, one of the founders of New Haven. Upon redundancy, the church was controlled by Yale University, which was already served by a nondenominational chapel.

Production history

See also 
 Yale Dramatic Association

External links
Official website

References 

Performing groups established in 1966
League of Resident Theatres
Regional theatre in the United States
Tony Award winners
Yale University
Former churches in Connecticut
Churches completed in 1846
Buildings and structures in New Haven, Connecticut
Gothic Revival church buildings in Connecticut
Victorian architecture in Connecticut
University and college theatres in the United States
Tourist attractions in New Haven, Connecticut
Theatres in Connecticut
Theatre companies in Connecticut